The 2022 Cork Premier Intermediate Football Championship was the 17th staging of the Cork Premier Intermediate Football Championship since its establishment by the Cork County Board in 2006. The draw for the group stage placings took place on 8 February 2022. The championship ran from 22 July to 23 October 2022.

The final was played on 23 October 2022 at Páirc Uí Chaoimh in Cork, between Kanturk and Bantry Blues, in what was their first ever meeting in the final. Kanturk won the match by 3-11 to 1-10 to claim their first ever championship title.

Cill na Martra's Mícheál Ó Deasúna was the championship's top scorer with 5-21.

Team changes

To Championship

Promoted from the Cork Intermediate A Football Championship
 Iveleary

Relegated from the Cork Senior A Football Championship
 Bantry Blues

From Championship

Promoted to the Cork Senior A Football Championship
 Newmarket

Relegated to the Cork Intermediate A Football Championship
 St. Nicholas'

Group A

Group A table

Group A results

Group B

Group B table

Group B results

Group C

Group C table

Group C results

Knockout stage

Bracket

Relegation playoff

Quarter-finals

Semi-finals

Final

Championship statistics

Top scorers

Overall

In a single game

References

External links
 Cork GAA website

Cork Premier Intermediate Football Championship